The Chico River is a river, about  long, flowing from Río Negro into Chubut Province, Argentina. Originating in the Andes foothills, it joins the Chubut River to the south of Cushamen. 

This river is not to be confused with the much longer Chico River joining the Chubut at Florentino Ameghino Dam.

See also
List of rivers of Argentina

References
 Rand McNally, The New International Atlas, 1993.
  GEOnet Names Server 

Rivers of Argentina